The TerrAfrica partnership is a US$4 billion, 12-year campaign supported by the African Union, World Bank, United Nations, European Commission, and regional sub-Saharan African governments, and aimed at fighting current, and preventing future desertification and other land degradation in Africa through sustainable land management.

It began October 2005.

See also
United Nations Convention to Combat Desertification

External links
Terrafrica
NEPAD page on TerrAfrica

African Union
Non-profit organisations based in South Africa
Environmental organisations based in South Africa
Environment of Africa